Ladislau "László" Zilahi (born 24 February 1922 – 1997) was a Romanian professional football player and manager of Hungarian ethnicity. Born in Oradea, Zilahi played in his career for CA Oradea, also called over time as: Libertatea, ICO or Progresul, with which won a Romanian national title in 1949 and for Debrecen. After retirement Zilahi coached CA Oradea and Bihor Oradea, named at that time as Crișul Oradea. As a manager he reached the Romanian Cup final in 1955 with CA Oradea, named at that time as Progresul.

International career
Ladislau Zilahi played for Romania in 3 matches and for Romania B in other 2 matches.

Honours

Player
CA Oradea
Liga I (1): 1948–49

Manager
CA Oradea
Romanian Cup Runners-up (1): 1955

References

External links
 
 
 Ladislau Zilahi at magyarfutball.hu
 Ladislau Zilahi at labtof.ro

1922 births
1997 deaths
Romanian sportspeople of Hungarian descent
Sportspeople from Oradea
Romanian footballers
Association football midfielders
Romania international footballers
Liga I players
CA Oradea players
Nemzeti Bajnokság I players
Debreceni VSC players
Romanian expatriate footballers
Romanian expatriate sportspeople in Hungary
Expatriate footballers in Hungary
Romanian football managers
CA Oradea managers
FC Bihor Oradea managers